Jean Clérée (1450–1507) was the Master of the Order of Preachers in 1507.

External links
Les sermons du dominicain Jean Clérée (1450-1507) - Hervé Martin 

1450 births
1507 deaths
French Dominicans
Masters of the Order of Preachers